The 2019 JEGS 200 was a NASCAR Gander Outdoors Truck Series race held on May 3, 2019, at Dover International Speedway in Dover, Delaware. Contested over 200 laps on the one-mile (1.6 km) concrete speedway, it was the sixth race of the 2019 NASCAR Gander Outdoors Truck Series season.

Entry list

Practice

First practice

Final practice

Qualifying

Qualifying results

Race

Summary

Brett Moffitt started on pole and led the first stage of the race, though Johnny Sauter trailed him closely. Sheldon Creed was able to catch up to Sauter and move up into contention thanks to lapped traffic. When Creed caught up to Moffitt, they approached Spencer Boyd and Ray Ciccarelli running side-by-side. The lapped trucks held up both Moffitt and Creed, allowing Sauter to take and hold on to the lead, winning the stage.

Creed got off pit road quickly and managed to lead 59 of the next 61 laps. A caution occurred due to Austin Wayne Self crashing on the front stretch, causing all of the drivers to make their final pit stops for the race. Creed fell behind while Ben Rhodes assumed the lead. Afterwards, Creed spun exiting Turn 2 and hit Todd Gilliland, heavily damaging the front of his truck, ultimately eliminating him from the race after his strong run.

Sauter was able to pass Rhodes for the lead with 30 laps to go, and held off a charging Brett Moffitt to claim his 24th career Gander Outdoors Truck Series victory and his third straight win at Dover.

Stage Results

Stage One
Laps: 45

Stage Two
Laps: 45

Final Stage Results

Stage Three
Laps: 110

References

2019 in sports in Delaware
JEGS 200
NASCAR races at Dover Motor Speedway